In geometry, the octagrammic cupola is a star-cupola made from an octagram, {8/3} and parallel hexadecagram, {16/3}, connected by 8 equilateral triangles and squares.

Related polyhedra

Crossed octagrammic cupola 

The crossed octagrammic cupola is a star-cupola made from an octagram, {8/5} and parallel hexadecagram, {16/5}, connected by 8 equilateral triangles and squares.

References 
 Jim McNeill, Cupola OR Semicupola
 Richard Klitzing, Axial-Symmetrical Edge Facetings of Uniform Polyhedra

External links 
 VRML models 8-3 8-5

Prismatoid polyhedra